Olivier Krumbholz (born 12 September 1958) is a French handball coach of German descent for the French women's national team. He brought the French team to victory at the 2003 World Women's Handball Championship in Croatia, and has later coached the team at the 2004 Summer Olympics and the 2008 Summer Olympics.

He was coach for the French team at the 2009 World Women's Handball Championship in China, where the French team has reached the final.

References

French male handball players
French handball coaches
French Olympic coaches
Living people
1958 births
Sportspeople from Moselle (department)
Handball coaches of international teams
French people of German descent